Loanda is a city in the northwestern region of Paraná, one of Brazil's southern states.  As of 2020, the estimated population was 23,242.

References

Municipalities in Paraná